Kurki of Laukko refers to a Finnish noble family.

Kurki may also refer to:

Places
Kurki, Iran (disambiguation), multiple places in Iran
Kurki, Greater Poland Voivodeship (west-central Poland) 
Kurki, Kozienice County in Masovian Voivodeship (east-central Poland)
Kurki, Mława County in Masovian Voivodeship (east-central Poland)
Kurki, Gmina Grajewo in Podlaskie Voivodeship (north-east Poland)
Kurki, Gmina Szczuczyn in Podlaskie Voivodeship (north-east Poland)
Kurki, Działdowo County in Warmian-Masurian Voivodeship (north Poland)
Kurki, Olsztyn County in Warmian-Masurian Voivodeship (north Poland)

Other uses
Kurki (surname), including a list of people with the name